Barry Monaghan is an Irish Gaelic footballer who plays for Four Masters and also, formerly, the Donegal county team.

Club
Monaghan won the Donegal Senior Football Championship with his club in 2003. He scored two points in the final against Termon.

Inter-county
Monaghan won the All-Ireland Vocational Schools Championship in 1995.

Monaghan made his Donegal debut in October 2000 in what was Mickey Moran's first game in charge, a league victory at home to Offaly, in which he scored a point.

He made his championship debut in 2001.

He played in the 2003 All-Ireland Senior Football Championship semi-final against Armagh.

He played in the 2006 Ulster Senior Football Championship Final at Croke Park. He was a member of the Donegal team that won the National Football League in 2007, playing from the start to the end in the final against Mayo.

In 2010, he announced he would take a break. He returned the following month.

A serious leg injury ended his career.

He also captained his county.

He is the son of Donal Monaghan, the Donegal All Star winner.

Honours
Donegal
 National Football League Division 1: 2007
 All-Ireland Vocational Schools Championship: 1995

Club
 Donegal Senior Football Championship: 2003

References

External links
 Barry Monaghan at gaainfo.com

Year of birth missing (living people)
Living people
Donegal inter-county Gaelic footballers
Four Masters Gaelic footballers